The 2016 Arkansas Razorbacks baseball team represents the University of Arkansas in baseball at the Division I level in the NCAA for the 2016 season.

Schedule and results

Record vs. conference opponents

References

Arkansas
Arkansas Razorbacks baseball seasons
Arkansas baseball